X Games XV was the fifteenth annual X Games extreme sports event. It took place from July 30 – August 2, 2009, in Los Angeles, California, at the Staples Center and the Home Depot Center. It was broadcast on ESPN networks, ABC, and EXPN.com.

The game featured the sports of motocross, skateboarding, BMX, surfing, and rallying.

Results

Moto X

Skateboarding

BMX

Rallying

Highlights
Highlights from the competition include:
 Jake Brown wins gold in Skateboard Big Air, two years after he suffered a horrific crash in the same event.
 Danny Way wins the inaugural Big Air Rail Jam, a contest which he created.
 Josh Hansen, son of champion Moto X rider Donnie Hansen, wins his second consecutive gold in Moto X Super X.
 Kyle Loza becomes the first person to win three consecutive gold medals in Moto X Best Trick in controversial fashion by using the same trick he used to win in 2008, The Electric Doom.
 Ricky Carmichael suffers an injury during Moto X Step Up. Due to the circumstances, dual gold medals were awarded to Carmichael and to Ronnie Renner.
 Anthony Napolitan lands the first ever double front flip on a bicycle.
 Blake Williams becomes the first non-American rider to win Moto X Freestyle gold.
 Jamie Bestwick wins his third consecutive gold in BMX Vert.
 Pierre-Luc Gagnon wins his second consecutive gold in Skateboard Vert.
 Travis Pastrana crashes in the final round of Rally Car Racing, while neck-and-neck with Kenny Bräck who then could go on to win the gold.

References

External links
EXPN.com
ESPN events schedule

X Games in Los Angeles
2009 in American sports
2009 in rallying
2009 in multi-sport events
2009 in Los Angeles
August 2009 sports events in the United States